The Kabaena bow-fingered gecko (Cyrtodactylus jellesmae) is a species of gecko, a lizard in the family Gekkonidae. The species is endemic to Indonesia.

Etymology
The specific name, jellesmae, is in honor of Dutch botanist Eeltje Jelles Jellesma (1851–1918).

Geographic range
In Indonesia C. jellesmae is found on the island of Sulawesi. 

The type locality is restricted to Masarang, Sulawesi, Indonesia.

Reproduction
C. jellesmae is oviparous.

References

Further reading
Boulenger GA (1897). "A Catalogue of the Reptiles and Batrachians of Celebes, with special reference to the Collections made by Drs. P. & F. Sarasin in 1893–1896". Proceedings of the Zoological Society of London 1897: 193-237 + Plates VII-XVI. (Gymnodactylus jellesmæ, new species, pp. 203-204 + Plate VII, figures 1, 1a, 1b, 1c).
Koch, André (2012). Discovery, Diversity, and Distribution of the Amphibians and Reptiles of Sulawesi and its offshore Islands. Frankfurt am Main: Edition Chimaira. 374 pp. .
Kramer, Eugen (1979). "Typenkatalog der Echsen im Naturhistorischen Museum Basel (BM), Stand 1978 ". Revue suisse de Zoologie 86 (1): 159–166. (Cyrtodactylus jellesmae, new combination, p. 160). (in German).
Rösler H (2000). "Kommentierte Liste der rezent, subrezent und fossil bekannten Geckotaxa (Reptilia: Gekkonomorpha)". Gekkota 2: 28–153. (Cyrtodactylus jellesmae, p. 66). (in German).

Cyrtodactylus
Reptiles described in 1897
Taxa named by George Albert Boulenger